Jean-Pierre Améris (born 26 July 1961) is a French film director and screenwriter. His film Lightweight was screened in the Un Certain Regard section at the 2004 Cannes Film Festival.

Filmography

References

External links

1961 births
Living people
French film directors
French male screenwriters
French screenwriters
Mass media people from Lyon